No Night So Long is a studio album by American singer Dionne Warwick. It was released by Arista Records on July 18, 1980 in the United States. Her second album for the label, Warwick worked with producer Steve Buckingham on the album which was recorded during the spring of that year.

Singles
The album's title track, "No Night So Long", was written by Richard Kerr and Will Jennings, the same team that wrote Warwick's 1979 comeback hit "I'll Never Love This Way Again". The title track is one of two US charting songs from the album, reaching number 23 on the Billboard Hot 100. The other single, "Easy Love," peaked at number 62 on the same chart.  Both songs were also hits on the Adult Contemporary chart with "Easy Love" peaking at number 12 and "No Night So Long" spending three weeks at number 1.

Track listing
All tracks produced by Steve Buckingham.

Personnel 
Musicians

 Dionne Warwick – lead and backing vocals
 Randy McCormick – keyboards, rhythm track arrangements 
 Joe Neil – synthesizers
 Isaac Hayes – Hammond organ
 Steve Buckingham – guitar, rhythm track arrangements 
 Larry Byrom – guitar
 Tom Robb – bass guitar
 James Stroud – drums
 Mickey Buckins – percussion
 Steve Dorff – timpani, orchestra bells, string arrangements and conductor 
 Jimmy Getzoff – concertmaster
 Jay Scott – alto saxophone solo
 Tower of Power Horn Section:
 Greg Adams – horn arrangements
 Emilio Castillo – tenor saxophone 
 Stephen Kupka – baritone saxophone 
 Lenny Pickett – alto saxophone, tenor saxophone
 Mic Gillette – trombone, trumpet, flugelhorn 
 Kim Carnes – backing vocals 
 Mark Piscitelli – backing vocals
 Nick Uhrig – backing vocals
 Maxine Waters – backing vocals
 Julia Waters – backing vocals

Production

 Producer – Steve Buckingham
 Production Assistants – Kathy Andrews and Jan Bidewell
 Engineers – Alan Chinowsky, Joe Neil and Lenny Roberts.
 Assistant Engineers – Russell Bracher and Alex Kashevaroff
 Recorded at Mastersound Studios (Atlanta, GA); Britannia Studios (Hollywood, CA); Record Plant (Sausalito, CA).
 Mixed at Mastersound Studios
 Mastered by Glenn Meadows at Masterfonics (Nashville, TN).
 Art Direction and Design – Donn Davenport 
 Photography – Harry Langdon

Charts

References

External links
No Night So Long at Discogs

Dionne Warwick albums
1980 albums
Albums produced by Steve Buckingham (record producer)
Arista Records albums